Kid Galahad is an EP by American singer Elvis Presley, containing six songs from the motion picture of the same name. Six songs were recorded for the film and the soundtrack was issued as an extended play record in August 1962 to coincide with the film's premiere. The extended play record was certified Gold by the Recording Industry Association of America on March 27, 1992, for the sales of 250,000 copies. The featured song from the album, "King of the Whole Wide World," received Top 40 radio airplay and reached No. 30 on the Billboard Hot 100 singles chart. The extended play record was the number-one EP in the UK for 17 weeks.

Recording and release history 
Recording sessions took place ten months prior to the film's release on October 26 and 27, 1961, at Radio Recorders Studios in Hollywood, California. At this point in his career Presley had a proven sales track record, and up to 300 demos were often submitted for a single film, even given the requisite publishing arrangements favorable toward the companies owned by Elvis and the Colonel, Elvis Presley Music and Gladys Music. As the plots for Presley films became interchangeable, songs rejected for a certain storyline could later be used for an entirely different film, as with "A Whistling Tune" which had been omitted from Presley's previous film Follow That Dream but found a place here instead.

Track listing

Personnel
 Elvis Presley – vocals
 The Jordanaires – background vocals
 Boots Randolph – saxophone
 Scotty Moore – rhythm guitar
 Neal Matthews, Jr. – acoustic guitar
 Tiny Timbrell – lead guitar
 Dudley Brooks – piano
 Bob Moore – double bass
 D.J. Fontana – drums
Buddy Harman – drums

References

External links 
 
 Kid Galahad (EP) at AllMusic

1962 soundtrack albums
Elvis Presley soundtracks
RCA Records soundtracks
1962 EPs
Elvis Presley EPs
RCA Records EPs
Albums produced by Jeff Alexander
Musical film soundtracks